Dr. Kevin Clancy is a numismatist and the Director of the Royal Mint Museum. Clancy is also Secretary to the Royal Mint Advisory Committee on the Design of Coins, Medals, Seals and Decorations which advises the British Government and Crown on the designs of coins and similar objects.

Publications
As author
The recoinage and exchange of 1816-17. PhD Thesis, University of Leeds, 1999.
A history of the sovereign: chief coin of the world. (2015). ISBN 978-1-869917005
An illustrated history of the Royal Mint. (2016). ISBN 978-1-869917012 
Objects of war: currency in a time of conflict. (2018) ISBN 978-1-907427909

As editor
Designing change: The art of coin design. Llantrisant: Royal Mint, 2008. 
Britannia: icon on the coin. (2016) ISBN 978-1-869917029
When Britain went Decimal: the coinage of 1971. (2021) ISBN 978-1-912667567

References

Living people
Alumni of the University of Leeds
Year of birth missing (living people)
British numismatists